The Srinagarindra Road is a road named to honour the Princess Mother, Srinagarindra (the mother of King Bhumibol Adulyadej, the Great) during The Princess Mother's 7th Cycle Birthday Anniversary, 21 October 1984. It connects Bang Kapi District to Mueang Samut Prakan District. It has the route number 3344 as  Thailand Highway Route 3344.

References 

National highways in Thailand
Streets in Bangkok